The 1924 Connecticut Aggies football team represented Connecticut Agricultural College, now the University of Connecticut, in the 1924 college football season.  The Aggies were led by second year head coach Sumner Dole, and completed the season with a record of 6–0–2.  The Aggies were members of the New England Conference and went 4–0 in conference games, claiming their first conference championship.  The New York Times said the team was one of the best in the nation, and the defense was the top in the nation, giving up only 13 points all season.  The Aggies defeated rival Massachusetts for the first time.

Schedule

References

Connecticut
UConn Huskies football seasons
College football undefeated seasons
Connecticut Aggies football